The 1893 college baseball season, play of college baseball in the United States began in the spring of 1893.  Play largely consisted of regional matchups, some organized by conferences, and ended in June.  For the first and only time prior to 1947, a national championship event was organized by Amos Alonzo Stagg.  With competition at the Chicago World's Fair, the champions of the East, South, and West met, with Yale defeating  9–0 in the final game.

New programs
LSU, Navy, and Ole Miss began varsity play for the first time.

Chicago World's Fair Tournament
The champions of the West and South played a double-elimination tournament prior to the arrival of teams from the East (New England).

A second bracket consisting of Virginia and the four teams from New England followed next, with several games played at South Side Park.

References